Mechanicsville is the name of places in the U.S. state of Pennsylvania:
Mechanicsville, Bucks County, Pennsylvania
Mechanicsville, Lancaster County, Pennsylvania
Mechanicsville, Lehigh County, Pennsylvania
Mechanicsville, Montour County, Pennsylvania
Mechanicsville, Schuylkill County, Pennsylvania

See also
Mechanicsville, Delaware, formerly claimed by both Pennsylvania and Delaware

nl:Mechanicsville (Pennsylvania)